The Shah wa Arus Dam is a 75m high concrete gravity dam located in the Shakardara District of Kabul Province in Afghanistan. It has a 60m wide three-bay spillway and is mainly geared towards provision of irrigation water as well as flood control and reliable year-round fresh water supply. Once operational, the dam will produce 1.2 megawatts (MW) of power and irrigate 2,700 hectares of land in addition to supplying drinking water for the millions of residents of Kabul.

Construction of Shah wa Arus Dam has long been proposed by the Afghan government. The bidding process deadline of the Dam was on 24 March 2014, in which an Iranian company known as Tablieh and Parhoon Tarh JV was chosen as the main contractor for the project. Its work was to build the Shah-wa-Arus irrigation and hydropower project, which included a rock-filled dam, intake, powerhouse, pickup weir with balancing reservoir and head regulators, and right and left side main canals. The Design-Build contract was awarded to Alborz Sazeh Company.

President Ashraf Ghani visited the construction site on 19 June 2015. The total cost of the Dam came to around $50 million, with 81 meters height at the rocky base and about 330,000 cubic meters of concrete, would be the first Roller-compacted concrete (R.C.C) that will be implemented within 55 months. The overall project created jobs for 500 Afghans during its completion process.

The Shah-wa-Arus Multipurpose Dam Project has the following major components:

Roads, Bridges & other Infrastructure              
Concrete Dam with Power Intake Structure                 
Power House
Pick up weir with Balancing Reservoir and Head Regulators

See also
List of dams and reservoirs in Afghanistan

References 

Dams in Afghanistan
Geography of Kabul Province
Dams completed in 2021